The women's tumbling competition in trampoline gymnastics at the 2001 World Games took place from 19 to 21 August 2001 at the Akita City Gymnasium in Akita, Japan.

Competition format
A total of 4 athletes entered the competition. After preliminary round all of them qualifies to the final. Preliminary round scores doesn't count in the final.

Results

Preliminary

Final

References

External links
 Results on IWGA website

Trampoline gymnastics at the 2001 World Games